Mahavir Prasad Dwivedi (15 May 1864 – 21 December 1938) was an Indian Hindi writer and editor. Adhunikkaal, or the Modern period of the Hindi literature, is divided into four phases, and he represents the second phase, known as the Dwivedi Yug (1893–1918) after him, which was preceded by the Bharatendu Yug (1868–1893), followed by the Chhayavad Yug (1918–1937) and the Contemporary Period  (1937–present).

Biography
He was born in Kanyakubja Brahmin family on 5 May 1864 in Daulatpur village, now in Raebareli District of Uttar Pradesh. His father Ram Sahay Dwivedi was a soldier in East India Company's army, later worked in Bombay as temple priest for the leaders of the Vallabha sampradaya.

Dwivedi received his early education in Sanskrit at his home, and in Hindi and Urdu at the Daulatpur village school. At the age of thirteen, he was sent to the district school in Raibareli, where he studied English and Persian for one year, and then attended schools in Purva, Fatehpur, and Unao for four years.

Career
During his Indian Railways service in Jhansi in the 1880s, Dwivedi earned wide fame as a writer and litterateur. He published his translations and the critical works including Sahitya Sandarbh and  Vichar Vimarsh.

In 1903, Dwivedi joined the Hindi monthly, Saraswati and was able to edit the journal with a knowledge of both classical and contemporary literature gained from his writing experiences. During his tenure as the editor (1903–20), Saraswati became most popular Hindi magazine.

He was considered as the mentor of Maithili Sharan Gupt, another noted Hindi poet and writer.

Works
 Kavya manjusha
 Kavitakalap
 Sugandh
 Mere Jeevan ki Yatra
 Sahitya Sandarbh

References

External links
 
 
 Brief profile at indiavisitinformation.com, Retrieved 2011-07-02.

Hindi-language writers
People from Raebareli district
People from Jhansi
1864 births
1938 deaths
Poets from Uttar Pradesh
19th-century Indian poets
20th-century Indian poets